The R479 road is a regional road in Ireland. It is located west of The Burren in County Clare. The road forms part of the Wild Atlantic Way.

The R479 travels southwest from the R477 to Doolin. Here the road turns southeast before ending at the R478.

References

Regional roads in the Republic of Ireland
Roads in County Clare